Caroline Bliss (born 12 July 1961) is an English actress who trained at the Bristol Old Vic Theatre School. She is best known for her appearances as M's secretary, Miss Moneypenny, in the James Bond films of the Timothy Dalton era.

Early life
She attended Godolphin and Latymer School, in the year above her Miss Moneypenny successor, Samantha Bond.

Miss Moneypenny
At the age of 25, Bliss replaced Lois Maxwell for the role of Miss Moneypenny in the films The Living Daylights and Licence to Kill.

Personal life
Bliss is the granddaughter of composer Sir Arthur Bliss, former Master of the Queen's Music. She is married to author and actor Andy Secombe and the couple live in Goonbell with their two children.

Filmography
Her film and television work includes appearances in:
 Charles & Diana: A Royal Love Story (1982) (TV) .... Princess Diana
 Killer Contract (1984) .... (TV) Celia Routledge
 Pope John Paul II (1984) (TV) .... Rosa Kossack
 My Brother Jonathan (1985) (TV) .... Edie Martyn
 The Living Daylights (1987) .... Miss Moneypenny
 The Moneymen (1987) (TV) .... Sarah
 Licence to Kill (1989) .... Miss Moneypenny
 Braxton (1989) .... Vanessa Rawlings
 The Paradise Club (1990) (TV) .... DI Sarah Turnbull
 Insektors (1994) (TV)
 Ruth Rendell - A Case of Coincidence (1996) (TV) .... Sarah Quin
 Blitzlicht (aka Inside Out in the U.S.) (1996)

Theatre
Her theatre work includes:
Blood Brothers
Blue Remembered Hills
Eve
Fuente Ovejuna
Good
Particular Friendships
Romeo and Juliet
Rough Justice
The Invisible Man
The Night They Raided Minsky's

References

External links

An actor's search for the simple life

|-

1961 births
Living people
English film actresses
English stage actresses
20th-century English actresses
Alumni of Bristol Old Vic Theatre School
People educated at Godolphin and Latymer School